The Grote Prijs van Nederland (Dutch for "Grand Prize of the Netherlands") is a series of music awards handed out yearly since 1983 to recognize talented new Dutch musicians, both solo artists and bands. It is the largest and longest-running pop music competition in the Netherlands. Previous winners include producer Junkie XL, rock band Green Lizard, rapper Brainpower, pop group Volumia! and singer-songwriter Signe Tollefsen. 

The awards are given in four different music categories: 
 Rock/Alternative
 Hiphop
 Singer/Songwriter
 Dance/Producers

Winners receive € 5,000 each, and are given the chance to perform at Dutch music festivals such as Noorderslag and Parkpop. In addition, public choice awards and best musician awards are given out in each category. The winners of these awards receive € 1,000 each. With the exception of the public choice awards, winners are chosen by jury. 

Band and musicians can enter the competition online, presenting two or three tracks along with a biography and a photo. The nominees are chosen by a jury and perform in regional quarter finals and semifinals. The finals in each category are held at the  Paradiso and Melkweg venues in Amsterdam.

Winners

1983-1994 
During this period, a single award was handed out each year.

 1983: Neel
 1984: GaGa
 1985: Gin on the Rocks
 1986: Longstoryshort
 1987: The Riff
 1988: One Track Charlie
 1989: No award given
 1990: La Lupa
 1991: Super and the Allstars
 1992: Doc Aerobics Lobo Probe
 1993: 20 Brothers House
 1994: No award given

Since 1995 
From 1995 onwards, awards were given out in multiple categories.

References

External links
 Website of the Grote Prijs van Nederland
 YouTube channel of the Grote Prijs van Nederland

Dutch music awards